Ōhaupō railway station was a station located at Ōhaupō on the North Island Main Trunk in New Zealand. It was the terminus of the line from Auckland from 1878 to 1880 and closed in 1982. Only a passing loop remains.

History 
Opening of the line from Hamilton to Ōhaupō had been planned for 25 February 1878, as a report on 13 February said it was ready to be opened. The Governor General went over the line on 27 March 1878, but opening was postponed, due to subsidence at Rukuhia, until 4 June 1878. The service started with two trains a day. A platelayer's cottage was built by July 1878 and the station and stationmaster's house by July 1879. From 1879 to 1913 there was a Post Office at the station.

On Thursday 1 July 1880 the line was extended to Te Awamutu and £397 was spent on moving the engine shed and driver's cottage there. By 1884 Ōhaupō had a 4th class station, passenger platform, cart approach to platform,  by  goods shed, loading bank, cattle yards, stationmaster's house, urinals and a passing loop for 37 wagons. By 1896 the goods shed had a verandah. By 1902 there was a ladies' waiting room, public vestibule, ticket lobby, stationmaster's office, an asphalt platform and a 7-room stationmaster's house. In 1905 the station was enlarged, a shelter added and a caretaker appointed. In 1909 a verandah was added and by 1911 the loop could hold 75 wagons. After the NIMT fully opened in 1909, Ōhaupō was served by local trains connecting with the expresses. In 1927 the station handled 2,686 tons of fertiliser. Two state houses were added in 1956. On Saturday 18 August 1956 Ōhaupō became an attended flag station. By 1980 the loop could hold 112 wagons. The station closed on Sunday 13 June 1982.

Traffic grew rapidly for the first two decades of the twentieth century, but then declined as buses and car increased (see graph and table below).

References

External links
Waikato Times, Vol XI, Issue 879, 7 Feb 1878, p. 2 – rapid progress with HAMILTON-OHAUPO RAILWAY EXTENSION.
Undated photos of station 
1967 photo of platform

Defunct railway stations in New Zealand
Rail transport in Waikato
Buildings and structures in Waikato
Railway stations opened in 1878
Railway stations closed in 1982